The legislative districts of Siquijor are the representations of the province of Siquijor in the various national legislatures of the Philippines. The province is currently represented in the lower house of the Congress of the Philippines through its lone congressional district.

History 
From 1907 the sub-province Siquijor was represented as part of the second district of Negros Oriental. Negros Oriental and the sub-province of Siquijor were represented in the Interim Batasang Pambansa as part of Region VII from 1978 to 1984.

Siquijor's first representative was elected in 1984, after it was established as a regular province on September 17, 1971 through Republic Act No. 6398. The province elected one representative to the Regular Batasang Pambansa from 1984 to 1986. Siquijor retained its lone district under the new Constitution which took effect on February 7, 1987, and elected its member to the restored House of Representatives starting that same year.

Lone District 
Population (2020): 103,395

At-large (defunct)

See also 
Legislative districts of Negros Oriental

References 

Siquijor
Politics of Siquijor